Bilohirka is a village in the Beryslav Raion of Kherson Oblast in southern Ukraine, about  north-east of the centre of Kherson city, beside the Inhulets river. The border of Kherson Oblast with Mykolaiv Oblast runs along the river on the north-west side of the village.

The village came under attack by Russian forces in May 2022, during the Russian invasion of Ukraine and was regained by Ukrainian forces by August/September the same year.

References

Villages in Beryslav Raion